Appen is a municipality in the district of Pinneberg, in Schleswig-Holstein, Germany. It is situated approximately 3 km west of Pinneberg, and 20 km northwest of Hamburg.

It is twinned with the village of Polegate, near Eastbourne in East Sussex, England.

The municipality is known for its annual Appen musiziert benefit concerts.

References

Pinneberg (district)